Pramod Malpe Madhwaraj is an Indian politician and a member of the Bharatiya Janata Party from the state of Karnataka. In June 2016 Madhwaraj was inducted into the Siddaramaiah led government of Karnataka as a cabinet minister with Independent Charge. Madhwaraj holds the Youth Empowerment and Sports Department, Fisheries Department portfolio in the Government of Karnataka. He is the 10th richest  minister in Karnataka to be sworn into the Karnataka Cabinet. Mr. Madhwaraj belongs to the Koli caste of Karnataka state of India.

Family
Mr. Pramod Madhwaraj is married to Mrs. Supriya Madhwaraj and they have a daughter named Prathyaksha. He is the son of former Congress Minister Manorama Madhwaraj.

Political life

Madhwaraj is from the Indian National Congress. He had represented Udupi Assembly Constituency of Udupi district, Karnataka from 2013 to 2018. Pramod Madhwaraj unsuccessfully fought the 2008  Karnataka Legislative Assembly election on an Indian National Congress ticket losing to K. Raghupati Bhat of the Bharatiya Janata Party by about 2500 votes. However, in the  following 2013 Karnataka Legislative Assembly election Madhwaraj won the  seat defeating B. Sudhakar Shetty of the Bharatiya Janata Party by over 39000 votes. In the 2018 Karnataka Legislative Assembly election, Madhwaraj lost to K. Raghupati Bhat of the Bharatiya Janata Party by about 2000 votes and a margin of 5%. Madhwaraj was educated in Mahatma Gandhi Memorial College and  National Institute of Technology, Karnataka. He completed his primary education at St. Cecily's Convent, Udupi and Christian High School Udupi. Pramod Madhwaraj is the managing Trustee of M Madhwaraj Charitable Trust which is named after his late father  M. Madhwaraj. The trust is very popular among the poor and helps a lot of poor people to make their ends meet. He joined the JD(S) ahead of the 2019 Lok Sabha Elections but campaigned for Congress president Rahul Gandhi as his party was in alliance with the Congress. He contested unsuccessfully from the Udupi-Chikmangalur Lok Sabha Constituency against Shobha Karandlaje of the BJP and lost by a margin of 28% or over 350000 votes.

Meat-eating beliefs
In October 2016, Madhwaraj stirred up some discomfort among local BJP leaders with his comments at a Valmiki Jayanti celebration, that Lord Rama, Lord Krishna and Maharishi Vyasa were meat eaters.

Departure from the Congress
On 7th May 2022, Pramod Madhwaraj resigned from the Congress party, expressing "political suffocation" in the Udupi district Congress. 2 days later, he joined the rival BJP.

Ministry

Besides holding the Youth Services Department, Fisheries from Animal Husbandry and Fisheries Department portfolio Madhwaraj  also  serves as the District In-Charge Minister for Udupi district. As the Fisheries minister Madhwaraj has tried to regulate fishing in coastal areas due to the depletion of aquatic animals on account of over fishing.

External links 
 Karnataka Legislative Assembly

References 

Living people
Karnataka MLAs 2013–2018
Indian National Congress politicians from Karnataka
1968 births
People from Udupi district